Albert Barney may refer to:

 Albert B. Barney (1835–1910), American lawyer, businessman, and legislator
 Albert W. Barney Jr. (1920–2010), American lawyer and judge